Bishop Connolly High School is a co-educational Catholic high school in Fall River, Massachusetts.

History
In 2020 Connolly took the high school students from Coyle And Cassidy School, which closed.

Citing a decline in enrollment and financial strain due to the COVID-19 pandemic, the school will close following the end of the 2022-23 school year.

Campus and building
The campus is adjacent to  Bristol Community College and B.M.C Durfee High School, Fall River's public high school is located directly across Elsbree Street. The campus contains a football field with bleachers and a concession stand, a soccer field, an outdoor non-rubber track, six tennis courts, a baseball field, a softball field and several practice fields.

The main school building is composed of three sections. The activities section contains a 1000-seat gymnasium, an 800-seat auditorium, and 200 seat cafeteria at the far west end. The middle academic wing contains the classrooms and most offices. At the far east end is the former faculty house, which is now the Cardinal Medeiros residence, a retirement home for diocesan priests. The library is located in a circular building in back of the main building and was renamed the "Academic Achievement Center" in 2012.

Academics
Beginning with the 2013–2014 school year, Bishop Connolly will divide its curriculum into three departments: Humanities (English, History, Foreign Language, Religion), Math & Science, and Fine Arts/Athletics, each headed by one of three academic deans. Aside from college preparatory classes, Connolly has extensive honors and advanced placement offerings, including Calculus AB/BC, Biology, Chemistry, English Literature, and US History. The average class size is 22–25 students. Honors sections average 15–18 students, while AP courses tend to number 8–11 students or fewer.

Bishop Connolly High School is accredited by the New England Association of Schools and Colleges.

Athletics

Connolly offers 23 different interscholastic sports for boys and girls and 38 separate teams throughout the year. Connolly is a member of The Massachusetts Interscholastic Athletic Associations's Mayflower League. The athletic squads are called the Cougars.

During the 1990s, Bishop Connolly's athletic squads routinely qualified for state tournament play. In 1993, the hockey program became the first Southeastern Massachusetts school to win a state championship. The Cougars have also won state championships in baseball (1990) and boys' tennis (1992); as well as south sectional titles in basketball, hockey, baseball, cross country, and tennis.

In 2003  Connolly fielded its first football team in school history.

In its first season in the Mayflower Athletic Conference, the Cougar lacrosse team won the league championship with a league record of 13-1 and an overall record of 14-4 which included a 1-1 record in the MIAA Division 3 tournament.  The team was led by 4th year head coach, Justin Shay.

In the 2009-2010 academic year, the boys' basketball and lacrosse teams were Mayflower League Champions.

In the 2010-2011 academic year, a banner was raised in every single season. In the fall, the boys' soccer team had a 12-3-3 record on their road to their Mayflower League Championship, which was the first boys' soccer title since 1993. The girls' basketball team won the Mayflower League title in the winter and the softball team also won a title in the spring. In the winter of 2011, the boys' basketball team won the Mayflower League Championship under new first year head coach Matt Coute, who is the all-time leading scorer at Bishop Connolly and was the replacement of the longtime coaching legend Billy Shea. In the spring of 2012, the Bishop Connolly baseball team won the Mayflower League Championship and made an unforgettable run to the Division 4 South Sectional Finals after defeating Cape Cod Tech, Pope John Paul II, and West Bridgewater.

On March 13, 2013, the boys' varsity basketball team won the Division IV State Championship  at the TD Garden in Boston, MA. Bishop Connolly was recognized by Fall River Mayor William Flanagan and numerous state representatives.

In 2015, the Cougars football team completed an undefeated regular season and won the Mayflower League championship. They qualified for the MIAA Division 6 playoffs, and drew the #3 seed in the tournament. The Cougars face off against small school powerhouse, and eventual state champions, Mashpee in the first round. The Cougars took a 7-6 lead into the fourth quarter, but the Falcons scored two fourth quarter touchdowns and upset the previously undefeated Cougars, 20-7. The Cougars were placed into the consolation bracket after being eliminated from the state playoffs, and they continued to dominate opponents. The Cougars football team finished the 2015 season with a 10-1 record, the best record in school history to date.

Athletic Accomplishments

Football - League Champions (2015)
Football - Playoff Qualifier (2014, 2015)
Boys' Soccer - League Champions (1993, 2010, 2015, 2016, 2017)
Cross Country - South Sectional Champions (1997)
Boys' Basketball - State Champions (2013)
Boys' Basketball - League Champions (2010, 2011, 2014, 2016)
Girls' Basketball - League Champions (2011)
Boys' Hockey - State Champions (1993)
Boys' Hockey - South Sectional Champions (1992, 1995)
Boys' Lacrosse - League Champions (2005, 2010)
Baseball - State Champions (1990)
Baseball - South Sectional Finalists (2012)
Baseball - League Champions (1990, 2012)
Softball - League Champions (2011)
Boys' Tennis - State Champions (1992)
Boys' Tennis - League Champions (2016, 2017)

Clubs and activities
Students at Bishop Connolly have the opportunity to participate in a wide variety of extracurricular activities, including
 Student Government
 Student Ambassadors
 Theatre Company
 Chorus
 Cheerleading
 National Honor Society
 Debate Team
 Math Team
 Mock Trial
 French Honor Society
 Spanish Honor Society
 Portuguese Honor Society
 Lacrosse
 Soccer
 Basketball
 Tennis
 Football
 Golf
 Track and Cross Country
 Unified Track
 Softball, Baseball
 Volleyball

Notable alumni
 David Gauvin (1964- ), former Welterweight boxer
 A. R. ("Bob") Tavares, (1964- ), former Rhode Island resident, current ASCAP songwriter.
 Daniel Boudria, full time teacher at the school 
 Jasiel Correira (1991- ), former mayor of Fall River

Notes and references

Catholic secondary schools in Massachusetts
Schools in Bristol County, Massachusetts
Educational institutions established in 1967
Buildings and structures in Fall River, Massachusetts
1967 establishments in Massachusetts